Roy Martin may refer to:

 Roy Martin (footballer) (born 1929), Scottish footballer
 Roy Martin (musician) (born 1961), English drummer
 Roy Martin (politician) (1921-2002), American politician
 Roy Martin (sprinter) (born 1966), American sprinter
 Roy Peter Martin (1931–2014), English author